William J. Lines is an Australian author.

He has written about the notable Western Australian botanist Georgiana Molloy., as well as walking the Bibbulmun Track.

He has written about environmental change in Australia.

He has also looked at the politics and dynamics of environmentalists and environmental groups.

Lynes history of The Wilderness Society (Australia) is a study of the interpersonal politics that beset any volunteer organization over time, with a focus upon former director Alec Marr.
Of his published works, his Taming the Great South Land has elicited the most extended discussion and reviews to date.

works

articles

References 

Living people
Australian writers
Year of birth missing (living people)